David Diaz, better known by his stage name Mr. SOS, is an American hip hop artist and producer. Once a member of the Lexington hip hop trio CunninLynguists, he is now a member of the group Mighty High Coup and continues to release solo material under his Mr. SOS moniker.

Discography
 Studio albums
 2004: "For President The Mixtape"
 2005: "For President Vol. 2: Inauguration"
 2009: "How I Learned To Stop Worrying And Love The Bomb"
 2011: "Cassette Verité"
 2013: "SOS for President 3: Re-Election"

 Extended Plays
 2006: "The Pre-Op"
 2012: "Trains Never Get Sidetracked"

 with CunninLynguists
 2003: "SouthernUnderground"
 2003: "Sloppy Seconds Volume One"

 with Mighty High Coup
 2010: "To the Moon"
 2011: "Boom Rap"
 2012: "Dark Side of the Boom"

Filmography

External links

1979 births
Living people
American hip hop record producers
American rappers
21st-century American rappers